Route 137 is a state highway in Hawaii County, Hawaii. The highway, known as the Kapoho-Kalapana Road, the Beach Road, or the Red Road, travels along the eastern coast of the island of Hawaii between Kalapana and Kapoho. It passes near Kīlauea and its lava fields, as well as Isaac Hale Beach Park and other protected areas.

Route description

Route 137 travels along the Pacific Ocean, near the flat flanks of Kīlauea, and through lava fields, as well as by Isaac Hale Beach Park and other protected areas. Locally it is known as the Red Road, due to its long having been paved with Hawaiian volcanic red cinder; most of it was paved with black asphalt in 2000 but it is still called the Red Road. It is a designated scenic byway, with picturesque tunnels of tropical trees and a variety of ocean vistas.

History

Several lava flows from Kīlauea have crossed sections of the highway en route to the Pacific Ocean. The 1990 lava flow that destroyed Kalapana moved along Highway 137. During the 2018 lower Puna eruption of Kīlauea's East rift zone, a lava flow from Fissure 20 buried a section of Route 137 between Kamaili Road and Pohoiki Road and flows from Fissure 8 flowed east across and along Hawaii Route 132, cutting more of Route 137 in the vicinity of Kapoho.

Major intersections

Appearances in art
Artist Arthur Johnsen (1952–2015), a resident of Lower Puna, depicted vistas of the Red Road in numerous plein-air impressionistic oil paintings. Many of these paintings were anthologized by the East Hawaii Cultural Center and the Hawaii Museum of Contemporary Art, in a 2014 book titled Paintings of the Red Road by Arthur Johnsen.

References

External links

 
 HWY 137 – Red Road Scenic Byway, Kapoho–Kaimu – Corridor Management Plan 2015

 0137
Transportation in Hawaii County, Hawaii
Scenic highways in the United States